Rääptsova is a village in Setomaa Parish, Võru County in southeastern Estonia.

References

 

Villages in Võru County